The 1969 Uganda National First Division League was the second season of the Ugandan football championship, the top-level football league of Uganda.

Overview
The 1969 Uganda National First Division League was contested by 10 teams and was won by Prisons.

League standings

Leading goalscorer
The top goalscorer in the 1969 season was Ali Kitonsa of Express FC with 36 goals.

References

External links
 Uganda - List of Champions - RSSSF (Hans Schöggl)
 Ugandan Football League Tables - League321.com

Ugandan Super League seasons
Uganda
Uganda
Football